Pebble Creek is an alpine ski area in the western United States, located in southeastern Idaho in the Portneuf Range in the Caribou National Forest.  It is east of Pocatello in eastern Bannock County, four miles (6 km) east of Inkom.It is currently owned by Internet personality Shay Butler.

Pebble Creek's runs are on the northwestern slope of Bonneville Peak (a.k.a. The mountain is named after Benjamin Bonneville, a U.S. Army officer who explored the Intermountain West in the 1830s. 

The ski area opened  in 1949 as Skyline, with two rope tows and a warming hut.  A Poma lift was installed in 1958, and another in 1960.  The first chairlift (double) was installed in 1966 which opened steeper terrain, and the current day lodge was built in 1968.

The area was sold in 1978 and again a year later to the Pebble Creek Land Company, which changed the area's name to Pebble Creek in 1979.  The CTEC triple chairlift was added in 1980, with additional terrain, and the area was sold again in 1981 to Pebble Creek Ski Area Ltd., a group of local investors.   In 2001, the old Minor-Denver double chair was replaced with a triple which extended the lift-served summit an additional 200 vertical feet (61 m).

Currently, Pebble Creek has three chairlifts (all triples) serving  of skiable terrain, rated at 12% beginner, 35% intermediate, and 53% advanced. Snowmaking was added in the lower areas of the mountain in the 1990s.

While Pebble Creek may be a relatively unknown area, it has previously been listed as one of the top 30 ski areas in the SNoBoard Magazines's annual "Where to ride guide" (volume 5, issue 2).

References

External links
 
 Ski Idaho - official state site
 Pebble Creek at IdahoSkiResorts.com
 Pebble Creek at OnTheSnow.com
 Pebble Creek at SkiTown.com
 Ski Map.org – trail maps – Pebble Creek ski area
 Photos of Bonneville Peak & Skyline Peak at IdahoSummits.com

Ski areas and resorts in Idaho
Buildings and structures in Bannock County, Idaho
Tourist attractions in Bannock County, Idaho
1949 establishments in Idaho